The Pulitzer Prize for Explanatory Reporting has been presented since 1998, for a distinguished example of explanatory reporting that illuminates a significant and complex subject, demonstrating mastery of the subject, lucid writing and clear presentation.  From 1985 to 1997, it was known as the Pulitzer Prize for Explanatory Journalism.

The Pulitzer Prize Board announced the new category in November 1984, citing a series of explanatory articles that seven months earlier had won the Pulitzer Prize for Feature Writing. The series, "Making It Fly" by Peter Rinearson of The Seattle Times, was a 29,000-word account of the development of the Boeing 757 jetliner. It had been entered in the National Reporting category, but judges moved it to Feature Writing to award it a prize. In the aftermath, the Pulitzer Prize Board said it was creating the new category in part because of the ambiguity about where explanatory accounts such as "Making It Fly" should be recognized.  The Pulitzer Committee issues an official citation explaining the reasons for the award.

List of winners for Pulitzer Prize for Explanatory Journalism (1985–1997)
 1985: Jon Franklin, The Baltimore Evening Sun, "for his seven-part series 'The Mind Fixers,' about the new science of molecular psychiatry."
 1986: Staff of The New York Times, "for a six-part comprehensive series on the Strategic Defense Initiative, which explored the scientific, political and foreign policy issues involved in 'Star Wars.'"
 1987: Jeff Lyon and Peter Gorner, Chicago Tribune. "for their series on the promises of gene therapy, which examined the implications of this revolutionary medical treatment."
 1988: Daniel Hertzberg and James B. Stewart, The Wall Street Journal, "for their stories about an investment banker charged with insider trading and the critical day that followed the October 19, 1987 stock market crash.
 1989: David Hanners, reporter; William Snyder, photographer; and Karen Blessen, artist, The Dallas Morning News, "for their special report on a 1985 airplane crash, the follow-up investigation, and the implications for air safety. "
 1990: David A. Vise and Steve Coll, The Washington Post, "for stories scrutinizing the U.S. Securities and Exchange Commission and the way it has been affected by the policies of its former chairman, John Shad."
 1991: Susan C. Faludi, The Wall Street Journal, "for a report on the leveraged buy-out of Safeway Stores, Inc., that revealed the human costs of high finance." 
 1992: Robert S. Capers and Eric Lipton, Hartford Courant, "for a series about the flawed Hubble Space Telescope that illustrated many of the problems plaguing USA's space program."
 1993: Mike Toner, The Atlanta Journal-Constitution, "for 'When Bugs Fight Back,' a series that explored the diminishing effectiveness of antibiotics and pesticides."
 1994: Ronald Kotulak, Chicago Tribune, "for his lucid coverage of current developments in neurological science."
 1995: Leon Dash, staff writer; and Lucian Perkins, photographer, The Washington Post, "for their profile of a District of Columbia family's struggle with destructive cycles of poverty, illiteracy, crime and drug abuse."
 1996:  Laurie Garrett, Newsday, "for her courageous reporting from Zaire on the Ebola virus outbreak there." (The winner was nominated in the International Reporting category but moved by the Pulitzer Prize Board to Explanatory Journalism.) 
 1997:  Michael Vitez, reporter, and April Saul and Ron Cortes, photographers of The Philadelphia Inquirer, "for a series on the choices that confronted critically ill patients who sought to die with dignity."

List of winners for Pulitzer Prize for Explanatory Reporting (1998–present)
 1998: Paul Salopek, Chicago Tribune, "for his enlightening profile of the Human Genome Diversity Project, which seeks to chart the genetic relationship among all people."
 1999: Richard Read, The Oregonian, "for vividly illustrating the domestic impact of the Asian economic crisis by profiling the local industry that exports frozen french fries."
 2000: Eric Newhouse, Great Falls Tribune, "for his vivid examination of alcohol abuse and the problems it creates in the community."
 2001: Staff of the Chicago Tribune, "for 'Gateway to Gridlock,' its clear and compelling profile of the chaotic American air traffic system."
 2002: Staff of The New York Times, "for its informed and detailed reporting, before and after the September 11th attacks on the USA, that profiled the global terrorism network and the threats it posed."
 2003: Staff of The Wall Street Journal, "for its clear, concise and comprehensive stories that illuminated the roots, significance and impact of corporate scandals in the US. This was originally nominated in the Public Service category, but was moved by the jury."
 2004: Kevin Helliker and Thomas M. Burton, The Wall Street Journal, "for their groundbreaking examination of aneurysms, an often overlooked medical condition that kills thousands of Americans each year."
 2005: Gareth Cook, The Boston Globe, "for explaining, with clarity and humanity, the complex scientific and ethical dimensions of stem cell research."
 2006: David Finkel, The Washington Post, "for his ambitious, clear-eyed case study of the United States government’s attempt to bring democracy to Yemen."
 2007: Kenneth R. Weiss, Usha Lee McFarling and Rick Loomis of the Los Angeles Times, "for their richly portrayed reports on the world's distressed oceans, telling the story in print and online, and stirring reaction among readers and officials."
 2008: Amy Harmon of The New York Times, "for her striking examination of the dilemmas and ethical issues that accompany DNA testing, using human stories to sharpen her reports."
 2009 Bettina Boxall and Julie Cart of the Los Angeles Times, "for their fresh and painstaking exploration into the cost and effectiveness of attempts to combat the growing menace of wildfires across the western United States."
 2010 Michael Moss and members of The New York Times staff "for relentless reporting on contaminated hamburger and other food safety issues."
 2011 Mark Johnson, Kathleen Gallagher, Gary Porter, Lou Saldivar and Alison Sherwood of the Milwaukee Journal Sentinel "for their lucid examination of an epic effort to use genetic technology to save a 4-year-old boy imperiled by a mysterious disease, told with words, graphics, videos and other images."
 2012 David Kocieniewski of The New York Times "for his lucid series that penetrated a legal thicket to explain how the nation’s wealthiest citizens and corporations often exploited loopholes and avoided taxes."
 2013 The New York Times staff (reporters included David Barboza, Charles Duhigg, David Kocieniewski, Steve Lohr, John Markoff, David Segal, David Streitfeld, Hiroko Tabuchi, and Bill Vlasic) "for its penetrating look into business practices by Apple and other technology companies that illustrates the darker side of a changing global economy for workers and consumers."
 2014 Eli Saslow of The Washington Post "for his unsettling and nuanced reporting on the prevalence of food stamps in post-recession US, forcing readers to grapple with issues of poverty and dependency."
 2015 Zachary R. Mider of Bloomberg News "for a painstaking, clear and entertaining explanation of how so many U.S. corporations dodge taxes and why lawmakers and regulators have a hard time stopping them."
 2016 T. Christian Miller of ProPublica and Ken Armstrong of The Marshall Project "for a startling examination and exposé of law enforcement's enduring failures to investigate reports of rape properly and to comprehend the traumatic effects on its victims."
 2017 International Consortium of Investigative Journalists, McClatchy and Miami Herald "for the Panama Papers, a series of stories using a collaboration of more than 300 reporters on six continents to expose the hidden infrastructure and global scale of offshore tax havens."
 2018 Staffs of The Arizona Republic and USA Today Network, for "vivid and timely reporting that masterfully combined text, video, podcasts and virtual reality to examine, from multiple perspectives, the difficulties and unintended consequences of fulfilling President Trump's pledge to construct a wall along the U.S. border with Mexico."
 2019 David Barstow, Susanne Craig and Russ Buettner of The New York Times for "an exhaustive 18-month investigation of President Donald Trump’s finances that debunked his claims of self-made wealth and revealed a business empire riddled with tax dodges."
 2020 The staff of The Washington Post "for a groundbreaking series that showed with scientific clarity the dire effects of extreme temperatures on the planet."
 2021 Ed Yong of The Atlantic for a series on the COVID-19 pandemic and Andrew Chung, Lawrence Hurley, Andrea Januta, Jaimi Dowdell and Jackie Botts of Reuters for reporting on how “qualified immunity” protects police from prosecution.
 2022 Staff of Quanta Magazine, notably Natalie Wolchover, "For coverage that revealed the complexities of building the James Webb Space Telescope, designed to facilitate groundbreaking astronomical and cosmological research."

See also

 List of journalism awards

Notes

References
 Winners of the Pulitzer Prize for Explanatory Reporting
 Winners of the Pulitzer Prize for Explanatory Journalism

Awards established in 1985
Explanatory reporting
1985 establishments in the United States